Manticos was a  heavy lift ship which was built by William Gray & Co. Ltd., West Hartlepool in 1944 as Empire Barbados for the Ministry of War Transport (MoWT). In 1948 she was sold and renamed Tennyson. She was sold again in 1950 and renamed Berylstone and in 1960 was again sold and renamed Manticos. On 8 October 1963 she developed a leak, and despite efforts to save her she sank on 22 October 1963.

History
Empire Barbados was built by William Gray & Co Ltd, West Hartlepool as yard number 1178. She was launched on 28 December 1944 and completed in March 1945. She was built for the MoWT and was initially operated under the management of Joseph Constantine Steamship Line Ltd. In 1946, management passed to the Rodney Steamship Co Ltd, London. In 1948 she was sold to the Rodney Steamship Co Ltd and renamed Tennyson, serving with them for two years under the management of Anglo-Danubian Transport Co Ltd, London. In 1950, Tennyson was sold to T Stone (Shipping) Ltd and renamed Berylstone. She was operated under the management of Stone & Rolfe Ltd, Swansea. Her port of registry was Llanelly. On 14 September 1951, Berylstone was bombed by three Soviet aircraft off Archangelsk. Berylstone served for ten years and was sold in 1960 to Compagnia Navigazione Zannis. Greece and renamed Manticos. She was operated under the management of A Halcoussis & Co, Greece.

Sinking
On 8 October 1963, Manticos was on a voyage from Libreville, Gabon bound for the Mediterranean with a cargo of logs when she developed a leak. On 16 October, a tug was alongside, assisting with pumping operations but on 22 October the leak increased and the stern section of Manticos submerged. The ship was declared a total loss.

Official number and code letters
Official Numbers were a forerunner to IMO Numbers.

Empire Barbados had the UK Official Number 180081 and used the Code Letters GFDX.

References

1944 ships
Ships built on the River Tees
Ministry of War Transport ships
Steamships of the United Kingdom
Merchant ships of Greece
Steamships of Greece
Shipwrecks in the Atlantic Ocean
Maritime incidents in 1963